Rodrigo Gary Vilca Betetta (born 12 March 1999) is a Peruvian footballer who plays as a midfielder for Premier League club Newcastle United. Started off with Deportivo Municipal, Vilca transferred to Newcastle United in 2020. He also had a loan spell with Doncaster Rovers.

Career
On 5 October 2020, Vilca moved to Premier League side Newcastle United on a four-year contract for an undisclosed fee, with Vilca initially joining their U23 side.

On 31 August 2021, Vilca joined Doncaster Rovers on loan until January 2022.

Career statistics

References

1999 births
Living people
Footballers from Lima
Peruvian footballers
Association football midfielders
Deportivo Municipal footballers
Newcastle United F.C. players
Doncaster Rovers F.C. players
Club Universitario de Deportes footballers
English Football League players
Peruvian expatriate footballers
Expatriate footballers in England
Peruvian expatriate sportspeople in England
Peruvian people of Italian descent